2020–21 Belarusian Cup was the thirtieth season of the Belarusian annual cup competition. Contrary to the league season, it is conducted in a fall-spring rhythm. It started in May 2020 and concluded with a final match in May 2021. BATE Borisov won the Cup and qualified for the second qualifying round of the 2021–22 UEFA Europa Conference League.

Participating clubs 
The following teams take part in the competition:

First round
In this round 6 amateur clubs were drawn with 12 Second League clubs. The draw was performed on 7 May 2020. The matches were played on 16 May 2020.

Second round
The draw was performed on 18 May 2020. The matches were played on 6 June 2020. Krumkachy  Minsk were given a bye to the next round by drawing of lots.

Round of 32
The draw was performed on 8 June 2020.

Round of 16
The draw was performed on 9 September 2020.

Quarter-finals

|}

First leg

Second leg

Semi-finals

|}

First leg

Second leg

Final
The final was played on 23 May 2021 at Central Stadium in Gomel.

References

External links
 Football.by

2020–21 European domestic association football cups
Cup
Cup
2020–21